Oliver Ernesto Branch (July 19, 1847 – June 22, 1916) was an American lawyer and politician from Weare, New Hampshire, who served in the New Hampshire House of Representatives and as  the United States Attorney for the District of New Hampshire.

Early life
Branch was born in Madison, Ohio, on July 19, 1847, to William Witter and Lucy J. (Bartram) Branch.

Education
On June 25, 1873, Branch graduated from Hamilton College in upstate New York.  While at Hamilton, Branch was a member of the Phi Beta Kappa honor society and the  Delta Upsilon fraternity.

In May 1877, from Columbia College Law School.

Family life
Branch married Sarah M. Chase, of Weare, on October 17, 1878. They had four children: Oliver Winslow Branch, Dorothy Witter Branch, Fredrick William Branch, and Randolph Wellington Branch.

Bar admissions
Branch was admitted to the New York Bar in June 1877 and practiced law in New York City. Branch was admitted to the New Hampshire bar in June 1884.

Public service

New Hampshire House of Representatives
Branch served in the New Hampshire House of Representatives from 1888 to 1892.

United States Attorney
On March 15, 1894, Branch was appointed by President Grover Cleveland to be the United States Attorney for the District of New Hampshire.

Death
Branch died in Manchester, New Hampshire, on June 33, 1916.

References

1847 births
Democratic Party members of the New Hampshire House of Representatives
United States Department of Justice lawyers
United States Attorneys for the District of New Hampshire
Hamilton College (New York) alumni
People from Madison, Ohio
Politicians from New York City
People from Weare, New Hampshire
Politicians from Manchester, New Hampshire
1916 deaths
19th-century American politicians
Columbia Law School alumni
Lawyers from New York City
19th-century American lawyers